Wadi el Maleh (also Wadi al Maleh, al Malich, etc.; , Nahal Milcha, Milkha Stream, also Milcha, Malcha, etc.) is a non-intermittent stream in West Bank.  It is within the basin of the Lower Jordan River near Highway 90 and is very low-watered, with the exception of storm discharge periods. 

(Its lower flow marks the southern boundary of the Beit She'an Valley.)

Notes

References

Rivers of the West Bank
Tributaries of the Jordan River